The Victorian Health Promotion Foundation is a statutory authority in the Australian state of Victoria, originally funded by hypothecated taxation raised by the Victorian Tobacco Act 1987. It was the first health promotion body in the world to be funded by a tax on tobacco.

Better known as VicHealth, the organisation has a mandate to promote good health for all Victorians. With a focus on promoting good health and preventing chronic disease, it leads and advocates for excellence in health-promoting policies and programs for:

 Active communities and sport
 Social connection and mental wellbeing
 Healthy and sustainable food systems
 Reducing harm from alcohol and tobacco products

History

Founding and early history (1987–1997) 
In 1987, the Victorian Health Promotion Foundation (VicHealth) was established with funding from government-collected tobacco taxes and mandated to promote health in the State of Victoria.

In 1988, VicHealth moved to buy out tobacco company sponsorship of sport and the arts. As a result, Quit, Heart Health and other health promotion programs replaced tobacco sponsorships. The Anti-Cancer Council of Victoria (now the Cancer Council Victoria) received funding from VicHealth to run its SunSmart and Quit programs and VicHealth funded the first Victorian breast cancer screening program.

In 1989, VicHealth funded significant research into Alzheimer's disease at the Mental Health Research Institute.

In 1994, VicHealth held its first national conference to examine the pioneering developments of working with sport and art organisations to promote health. VicHealth also funded the research arm of the Early Psychosis Prevention and Intervention Centre, a program aimed to increase the capacity to intervene and prevent youth suicide.

In 1995, VicHealth launched Healthy Families of the Future, a program to improve mental health and wellbeing within families.

In 1996, VicHealth was recognised with the World Health Organization Medal for Excellence and the Active for Life program launched in schools to teach children about making exercise a healthy lifetime habit to prevent heart disease.

1998–2007 
In 1998–1999, VicHealth launched the Koori Health Research and Community Development Unit and the Mental Health Promotion Plan for Victoria; focusing on social connection, freedom from discrimination and economic participation as major factors impacting on mental health.

In 2000, The VicHealth Centre for Tobacco Control opened, focusing on legal, economic and social research to strengthen tobacco control initiatives.

In 2001, smokefree dining in Victoria was introduced and the Together We Do Better campaign was launched; promoting mental health and wellbeing.

In 2002–2003, VicHealth joined forces with education, adolescent and welfare organisations to highlight bullying behaviour as a significant mental health issue and launched Leading the Way; working with councils to create healthier communities, and provide a resource to better equip councils to identify and respond to the built, social, economic and environmental issues that affect health and wellbeing in communities.

In 2006, VicHealth ran a 10,000 Steps Walking Challenge during the Melbourne 2006 Commonwealth Games, the largest of its kind to take place in Victoria. More than 1600 clubs participated in the Australian Drug Foundation’s Good Sports program, an initiative supported by VicHealth designed to change the booze culture that exists in many sporting clubs. VicHealth established a partnership with the AFL to advance violence prevention activity through sport.

In 2007, VicHealth supported a State Government ban on the sale of alcopop tubes and created the Victorian Health Inequalities Network to encourage public dialogue about the development of coherent strategies to reduce inequalities.

2008–current 
In 2008, VicHealth hosted the 2008 World Conference on the Promotion of Mental Health in Melbourne, and the Streets Ahead program was started to increase individual activity levels.  Improving neighbourhood walkability was the focus of the next year's Victoria Walks campaign.  The organisation began funding thirty State Sporting Associations to increase club-level involvement in sport, and its Motion program sought to increase community arts participation.  In 2012, VicHealth began a workplace health program to address issues ranging from individual stress to the effects of prolonged sitting.

The "Seed Challenge" campaign of 2013 sought to increase Victorians' consumption of healthy foods.  VicHealth was named a World Health Organization Collaborating Centre for Leadership in Health Promotion in September 2014.  In the same year, the organisation formed a panel of experts, "Leading Thinkers", to examine various health challenges from a range of theoretical perspectives.  A second round of arts funding began in 2015, as did the VicHealth Citizens' Jury on Obesity, a collection of online and in-person focus groups looking at simplifying healthy eating.

"This Girl Can - Victoria" was launched in 2018, borrowing an idea from a similar campaign in England to increase women's physical activity and health.  Three years later, the "Future Healthy" campaign was started to provide funding for a range of community organisations.

Strategic imperatives
VicHealth's Action Agenda for Health Promotion 2013–2023 focuses on the following five strategic imperatives:
 promoting healthy eating
 encouraging regular physical activity
 preventing tobacco use
 preventing harm from alcohol
 improving mental wellbeing
These priorities are consistent with VicHealth’s obligations under the Tobacco Act of 1987. They also align with State Government policy and program directions, and national and international health promotion priorities and policies such as the World Health Organization (WHO) charters and declarations for Health Promotion.

Organisation
VicHealth has a Board of Governance that is responsible to the Victorian Minister for Health. The current CEO is Dr Sandro Demaio. His predecessors were  Dr Lyn Roberts AO (Acting), Jerril Rechter, Todd Harper, Rob Moodie and Rhonda Galbally. Sir Gustav Nossal led VicHealth’s first Board, followed by Professor John Funder. VicHealth’s current Chair is the Hon Nicola Roxon.

See also
 Health Promotion
 Tobacco Control

References

External links
 VicHealth Website
 Future Healthy
 This Girl Can - Victoria
 TeamUp
 Name That Point
 Victoria Walks

Government agencies of Victoria (Australia)
Health education in Australia
Health promotion
Funding bodies of Australia
Medical and health organisations based in Victoria (Australia)
Government agencies established in 1987
1987 establishments in Australia